Parting may refer to:

Parting (film), a 2016 Afghan-Iranian film
Parting.com, a funeral home directory
Parting tradition
Cleavage (crystal)#Parting
Side-parting, a common male hairstyle: see Regular haircut
PartinG (gamer), a South Korean StarCraft II player
The Parting, an opera by Tom Cipullo
Gold parting or just parting, a final stage in gold extraction

See also

Part (disambiguation)